Life Doesn't Frighten Me is a children's book by American writer Maya Angelou. Originally released in 1993 by Stewart, Tabori, & Chang, the book was conceived and edited by Sara Jane Boyers. It combines a poem written by Angelou with illustrations by American artist Jean-Michel Basquiat. Neither the poem nor the paintings were created specifically for children, yet their simplicity convey feelings to create a "brave, defiant" tale that "celebrates the courage within each of us, young and old." For the 25th anniversary, Life Doesn't Frighten Me was re-released by Abrams Books in 2018.

Reception 
Reviewing the book, Publishers Weekly wrote:Boyers, a TV producer and art collector, deserves a standing ovation for her performance in pairing Angelou's poem with abstract paintings by the late Basquiat…the proximity of Basquiat's edgy, streetwise pictures adds even greater power and authenticity to Angelou's refrain, "Life doesn't frighten me at all.'' Conversely, the affirming quality of the poem mediates Basquiat's disquieting urban images. Basquiat's first works were drawn onto the walls of Manhattan buildings, and the frenzied, sometimes angry compositions here have the rawness of graffiti. The reproductions invite close scrutiny, implicitly teaching the viewer a way of approaching contemporary art and reinforcing the tough beauty of the poem.

References 

1993 children's books
American picture books
Books by Maya Angelou
Jean-Michel Basquiat
Abrams Books books